Duet is a 2006 Iranian short mockumentary film, shot in Damavand, Iran and written and directed by Kiarash Anvari.

Plot
A retired veteran of the 8 year Iran-Iraq war, paralyzed from injuries suffered in the conflict, struggles to bring peace to the world through a miracle after the attacks on the World Trade Center in September 2001. The ritual he performs depends on the help of his brother, a man who does not believe in miracles.

Cast
Kiarash Anvari as Narrator
Siavash Mazloumipour as Paralyzed Soldier
Salar Jahangard as Brother
Habib as Afghan kid
Zahra as Afghan kid

Festivals
The film has had multiple international screenings since its release: Palm Springs International Short Film Festival (2006), the 13th annual Bite The Mango Film Festival in 2007, the 5th Matsalu Nature Film Festival in 2007, and the 5th Signes de Nuit International Film Festival in Paris in 2007

References

External links
 Culture Unplugged
 

2006 films
Iranian short films
Persian-language films